The melomakarono ( plural: μελομακάρονα, melomakarona) is an egg-shaped Greek dessert made mainly from flour, olive oil, and honey.
Along with the kourabies it is a traditional dessert prepared primarily during the Christmas holiday season. They are also known as finikia.

Historically, melomakarona are thought to be derived from the ancient and medieval makaria, which were eaten during funerals. Gradual changes in the recipe and the addition of dipping them in honey led to melomakarona which etymologically is derived from the Greek word for honey "meli" and "makaria".

Typical ingredients of the melomakarono are flour or semolina, sugar, orange zest and/or fresh juice, cognac (or similar beverage), cinnamon and olive oil. During rolling they are often filled with ground walnuts.  Immediately after baking, they are immersed for a few seconds in cold syrup made of honey and sugar dissolved in water. Finally, they are decorated with ground, as well as bigger pieces of walnut. Dark chocolate-covered melomakarona are also a more recent variation of the traditional recipe.

See also
Loukoumades
Halva

References

Greek desserts
Cypriot cuisine
Christmas food
Walnut dishes
Foods with alcoholic drinks
Chocolate-covered foods
Honey dishes